Wakaleo (indigenous Australian waka, "little", "small", and Latin leo, "lion") was a genus of medium-sized thylacoleonids that lived in Australia in the Late Oligocene and Miocene Epochs. 
Although much smaller than its close relative, the marsupial lion (Thylacoleo carnifex), Wakaleo would have been a successful hunter. It had teeth specially designed for cutting and stabbing. The genus is from an extinct family of Vombatiformes, so it is distantly related to the herbivorous wombats.

Taxonomy 
Wakaleo was erected in 1974 by W. A. Clemens and M. Plane. Five species are known:

Wakaleo alcootaensis was found in the Miocene Waite Formation in the Northern Territory in 1974. It was slightly larger than the other two species.
Wakaleo oldfieldi was found by a group of scientists working in the Miocene Wipijiri Formation in southern Australia in 1971. They found a nearly complete left dentary which included a few well-preserved teeth.
Wakaleo pitikantensis described by Rauscher as the type species of the genus Priscileo in 1987 and placed with this genus in a revision published in 2017.
Wakaleo schouteni Gillespie, Archer & Hand, 2017, a mid-sized species of the genus.
Wakaleo vanderleuri was first found by field workers in 1967 in the Miocene Camfield Beds in the Northern Territory. Many more specimens have been found since then.

Description 
Wakaleo is a genus of the thylacoleonid family of predatory mammals, which are known as marsupial lions. The size of Wakaleo species increases from smaller animals in the early part of the fossil record, an apparent morphocline that terminated in a predator able to kill animals much larger than itself.

References

Tertiary Genera of Thylacoleonidae
Mikko's Phylogeny Archive

 
Miocene mammals of Australia
Miocene marsupials
Prehistoric marsupial genera
Fossil taxa described in 1974
Taxa named by William A. Clemens Jr.
Carnivorous marsupials